Grand River Airport  was located in the small community of Grand River, Prince Edward Island, Canada, by the river of the same name.

References

Defunct airports in Prince Edward Island
Transport in Prince County, Prince Edward Island
Buildings and structures in Prince County, Prince Edward Island